Asia Frontier Capital Ltd. is an investment company created by a management buyout of Leopard Capital by the former CFO and COO, Thomas Hugger, at the end of May 2013. Leopard Capital Management Ltd. was subsequently renamed Asia Frontier Capital Ltd. The group manages the AFC Asia Frontier Fund, AFC Iraq Fund, AFC Uzbekistan Fund, and AFC Vietnam Fund. All funds are open-end funds under the AFC Umbrella fund for US investors or AFC Umbrella fund (non-US) for investors outside from the US. Investors can subscribe or redeem the funds monthly at net asset value.

These type of funds invest specifically in the frontier markets asset class and aim to capture returns by managing a portfolio of stocks in high-growth markets.

AFC Asia Frontier Fund invests in listed equities from Bangladesh, Bhutan, Cambodia, Georgia, Iraq, Jordan, Kazakhstan, Kyrgyzstan, Laos, Maldives, Mongolia, Myanmar, Nepal, Oman, Pakistan, Papua New Guinea, Sri Lanka, Uzbekistan and Vietnam.

AFC Iraq Fund invests in companies from Iraq and Kurdistan listed on the Iraq Stock Exchange (ISX) or listed on other stock exchanges.

The AFC Uzbekistan Fund invests in companies from Uzbekistan and Kyrgyzstan listed on the Tashkent Stock Exchange or Kyrgyz Stock Exchange.

AFC Vietnam Fund invests in companies listed on the Ho Chi Minh City Stock Exchange or Hanoi Securities Trading Center.

The current directors are Thomas Eugen Hugger and Henry Looser, and among the shareholders is Marc Faber, a well-known early and experienced investor in frontier markets.

Asia Frontier Capital Ltd. subsidiary Asia Frontier Investments Limited, Hong Kong, is licensed by the Hong Kong Securities and Futures Commission "SFC" for Type 4 (Advising on Securities) and Type 9 (Asset Management) and is the company's headquarters.

Awards
AFC Asia Frontier Fund was named "New Fund Launch of the Year" in the 2014 Acquisition International M&A Awards, a vanity award. In 2014, it received "Asia - Boutique Fund Manager of the Year" and "Asia - Niche Fund Manager of the Year" from ACQ Magazine, "Fund Management Firm of the Year - Hong Kong" and "AFC Vietnam Fund - Best Fund of the Year" from "Alternative Investments Awards". AFC Asia Frontier Fund CHF A share was among "The Top 20 Performing Hedge Funds Globally" by Preqin. AFC Asia Frontier Fund received "Best Performing Asia Pacific Equity Fund" in 2015 and AFC Vietnam Fund "Best Performing Equity Fund - Vietnam", both by Acquisition International. Asia Frontier Capital also received in 2015 from Acquisition International "Iraq Investment Specialist of the Year", all vanity awards.

On 26 November 2015, Thomas Hugger, fund manager of AFC Asia Frontier Fund was ranked as #1 in "top-performing frontier markets equity fund manager over 36 months" ranking by Citywire Global.

AFC Vietnam Fund received on 19 September 2016 the HFM Hedge Fund Awards 2016 in the "relative value" category and the AFC Asia Frontier Fund received on 28 September 2017 the HFM Hedge Fund Awards 2017 in the "long/short equity Asia ex Japan" category.

Recent Developments
Citywire Selector praised Thomas Hugger on 8 March 2016 in its report as the "lone frontier market manager who made money in the past 12 months".

In September 2016 Asia Frontier Investments Limited opened a representative office in Ho Chi Minh City, Vietnam to further boost its research capabilities in the country.

References

Further reading

External links
 

Investment companies of Hong Kong
Investment companies of the Cayman Islands